The twelfth season of the One Piece anime series was directed by Hiroaki Miyamoto and produced by Toei Animation. It contains a single story arc, called , which mainly adapts material from the 53rd and 54th volumes of Eiichiro Oda's One Piece manga, following the adventures of Monkey D. Luffy and his Straw Hat Pirates after they are scattered across the world by Bartholomew Kuma. Focusing on Luffy, the first 10 episodes depict his stay on Amazon Lilly, an island that is inhabited solely by the Kuja, a tribe of women warriors, and ruled by their leader, the "Pirate Empress" Boa Hancock, one of the Seven Warlords of the Sea. The remaining 4 episodes give insight into the fates of Luffy's crew, while he travels to Impel Down, the world's largest prison, to save his brother, Portgas D. Ace, from execution.

The season initially ran from July 5 through October 11, 2009 on Fuji Television in Japan. The first two DVD compilations were released on April 6, 2011. The last two volumes were released on May 11, 2011. In Video Research's audience measurements in the Kantō region, these initial airings received household ratings ranging from 8.6 to 12.0, which earned every episode a place in Video Research's weekly Top 10 ranking of anime shows. The North American licensor of the series, Funimation, streamed the whole season's episodes subtitled in English for free on their website. Episodes 408 to 414 were streamed from the August 26 through the 28, 2009. On August 29, 2009, the rest of the season's episodes, starting from episode 415 onwards, were streamed as a simulcast, only one hour after they aired on Fuji Television in Japan.

Only a single piece of theme music is used during the season: the opening theme "Share the World" by TVXQ.



Episode list

Home releases

Japanese

English
In North America, the season was recategorized as part of "Season Seven" for its DVD release by Funimation Entertainment. The Australian Season Seven sets were renamed Collection 33 and 34.

Notes

References

2009 Japanese television seasons
One Piece seasons
One Piece episodes